Statistics of Latvian Higher League in the 1985 season.

Overview
It was contested by 15 teams, and Alfa won the championship.

League standings

References
 RSSSF

Latvian SSR Higher League
Football 
Latvia